Ayin or  is a letter of Semitic abjads, including Phoenician , Aramaic , Hebrew , and Arabic .

Ayin may also refer to:

Ayin (Kabbalah), the concept of nothingness in Kabbalah
 Âyin, an Ottoman satirical magazine published between 1921 and 1922
Əyin, a village in Azerbaijan
 , an abbreviation meaning "Arabic"

See also